is the fourth single of the Hello! Project duo W, released on February 9, 2005 on the Zetima label. A Single V DVD containing the music video was released on February 23, 2005. The song "Koi no Fuga" is a cover of a song originally released by The Peanuts in August 1967; "Furimukanaide" is also a song first recorded by The Peanuts, but was also covered in the 80s by Wink, and by Yuki Koyanagi in 2003.

Track listings

CD
  - 2:33
  - 3:00
  - 2:30

DVD
  - 2:37
  - 2:39
  - 12:14

Personnel
 Lyrics: Rei Nakanishi
 Composer: Koichi Sugiyama
 Arrangement: Hiroshi Miyagawa (original), Kōji Makaino (W version)
 Catalog No.: EPCE-5350 (CD), EPBE-5167 (DVD)

Was parodied in the Super Sentai Series Engine Sentai Go-Onger

External links
 Up-Front Works W discography entries: CD, DVD

W (group) songs
Zetima Records singles
2005 singles
Song recordings produced by Tsunku
2005 songs